The East Asian Games is a multi-sport event which began in 1993. Athletics has been one of the sports held at the Games since the inaugural edition. Records set by athletes who are representing one of the East Asian Games Association's member states.

Men's records

Women's records

Records in defunct events

Men's events

Women's events

References

External links

Athletics at the East Asian Games
East Asian Games
East Asian Games athletics
East Asian Games